Blue Jungle is the forty-seventh studio album by American recording artist Merle Haggard, with backing by his band, The Strangers, released in 1990. The album peaked at number 47 on the Billboard country albums chart. It was co-produced by Mark Yeary, the honky tonk piano player of Merle Haggard's band, 13 years in a row awarded the ACM Band of the Year, The Strangers.

Background
Blue Jungle marked Haggard's first album with Curb after his run on Epic Records ended with his 1989 album 5:01 Blues. Two songs, "My Home Is in the Street" (co-written with wife Teresa) and "Under the Bridge", deal with the topic of homelessness. "Driftwood" is updated from the version that appeared on Haggard's 1979 MCA LP Serving 190 Proof.

"When It Rains It Pours," the first single off of Merle's first record for Curb Records, was a ballad that peaked at number 38 on the music charts. Merle had a run in with Curb executives and refused to let them on his bus at a show in southern California. Following this episode, Curb stopped promoting to radio, Merle's new single, "When It Rains It Pours," (penned by his protege John Cody Carter) and immediately the single was stopped in its tracks. Curb later released the B side of "When It Rains It Pours," a song entitled "Me and Crippled Soldiers" penned by Merle.

Reception

The AllMusic review states: "...his songwriting expertise still remained intact...Blue Jungle is a glimpse of a performer with nothing to lose, away from the spotlight yet very much engaged with his material. According to Hank Cochran, legendary songwriter and close friend of Haggard, "Cody's song, 'When It Rains It Pours' was the jewel of the album."

Track listing
"Blue Jungle" (Merle Haggard, Freddy Powers) – 2:27
"Sometimes I Dream" (Haggard) – 2:57
"My Home Is in the Street" (Haggard, Teresa Lane Haggard) – 2:27
"When It Rains It Pours" (John Cody Carter) – 3:27
"Me and Crippled Soldiers" (Haggard, Bonnie Owens) – 3:12
"Under the Bridge" (Haggard) – 2:56
"Lucky Old Colorado" (Red Simpson) – 3:10
"Driftwood" (Haggard) – 2:47
"Never No Mo' Blues" (Elsie McWilliams, Jimmie Rodgers) – 3:01
"A Bar in Bakersfield" (Haggard, Powers) – 2:52

Personnel
Merle Haggard– vocals, guitar

The Strangers:
Norm Hamlet - Dobro, steel guitar
Clint Strong - acoustic guitar, electric guitar
Bobby Wayne - acoustic guitar
Mark Yeary - keyboards, piano
Biff Adam - drums, percussion
Don Markham - saxophone, trumpet
Gary Church - cornet, trombone

with:
Grady Martin - electric guitar
Bonnie Owens - background vocals

and:
Willie Savage - electric guitar
Steve Grahn - acoustic guitar
Gary Tackett - acoustic guitar
Reggie Brown - bass guitar
Mike Leech - bass guitar
Joe Reed - bass guitar
Eric Griffin - percussion
Steve Van Stralen - percussion
Steve Herman - harmonica

References

1990 albums
Merle Haggard albums
Curb Records albums